Pump Friction is the studio project of DJ/producer Lewis Dene from London. He scored a number 1 hit on the US Billboard Hot Dance Music/Club Play chart in 1997 with "That Sound". He also reached number 40 that same year with "Vicious" (as Pump Friction & Soundclash featuring Connie Harvey).

Dene is also one half of the duo Solitaire (with Dave Taylor), which a scored number 13 hit in 2004 on Hot Dance Music/Club Play and number 7 on the Dance Radio Airplay charts with "I Like Love (I Love Love)", which sampled Norma Jean Wright's "I Like Love".

Discography

Singles

See also
List of number-one dance hits (United States)
List of artists who reached number one on the US Dance chart

References

British house musicians
English dance musicians